Peter Herman Adler (2 December 1899, Gablonz an der Neiße, Bohemia – 2 October 1990, Ridgefield, Connecticut) was an American conductor born in Austria-Hungary in Gablonz an der Neiße, which is now in the Czech Republic.

Career
While at the Prague Conservatory, Adler studied with Vítězslav Novák, Fidelio Finke, and Alexander von Zemlinsky. He was the music and artistic director of the NBC Opera Theatre (1950–64) and the National Educational Television Opera. He was a pioneer of  televised broadcast of opera, commissioning such works as Gian Carlo Menotti's Amahl and the Night Visitors and Maria Golovin, Norman Dello Joio's The Trial at Rouen, and Bohuslav Martinů's The Marriage; Jack Beeson's My Heart's in the Highlands, Thomas Pasatieri's The Trial of Mary Lincoln and Hans Werner Henze's La Cubana. Adler was also involved in the early career development of such singers as Leontyne Price, George London and Mario Lanza. He later conducted the Baltimore Symphony Orchestra from 1959 to 1968.  He conducted the United States premiere of Ernst Bloch's opera Macbeth at the Juilliard School in May 1973.

Adler made only one foray into movies, adapting the music for The Great Caruso in 1950, for which he received an Academy Award nomination.

References

1899 births
1990 deaths
People from Jablonec nad Nisou
American male conductors (music)
20th-century American conductors (music)
20th-century American male musicians
American people of Czech-Jewish descent
Czechoslovak emigrants to the United States